The Niutron NV is an electric mid-size SUV to be produced by Chinese electric vehicle manufacturer Niutron in 2022.

Overview
The Niutron company and its first production model, the NV, were first announced on December 15, 2021. The production version the NV was revealed in March 2022. It is planned to go into production in September 2022 at Niutron's Changzhou production facility.

Specifications

Battery
Niutron has not yet revealed any details about the battery, but according to Niutron, the NV will have a  acceleration time of 5.9 seconds. Niutron is also developing a hybrid with an internal combustion engine (ICE) acting as a range extender to provide power to the battery.

Interior
At the front-row of the Niutron NV's interior features a large  touchscreen on the center console, as well as a digital instrument cluster and small screens located at the air vents for climate control. The rear seats feature another, larger screen for climate control. On the roof is a  panoramic sunroof.

References

Cars introduced in 2022
Sport utility vehicles
2020s cars
Cars of China
Production electric cars